Dorian Godon (born 25 May 1996) is a French cyclist, who currently rides for UCI WorldTeam . In August 2019, he was named in the startlist for the 2019 Vuelta a España.

Major results

2016
 2nd Trofeo Almar
2018
 7th Overall Boucles de la Mayenne
1st Prologue
 9th Overall Tour du Haut Var
2019
 6th Overall Boucles de la Mayenne
1st  Young rider classification
1st Prologue
 10th Tour du Finistère
 10th Grand Prix d'Isbergues
2020
 1st Paris–Camembert
2021
 1st Overall French Road Cycling Cup
 1st Paris–Camembert
 1st Tour du Doubs
 1st Stage 2 Tour de Limousin
 3rd Classic Loire Atlantique
 4th Grand Prix de Wallonie
 4th Cholet-Pays de la Loire
 4th Polynormande
 5th Faun-Ardèche Classic
 5nd Grand Prix du Morbihan
 6th Royal Bernard Drôme Classic
 10th Tour de Vendée
2022
 2nd Route Adélie
 5th Tour du Jura
2023
 10th La Drôme Classic

Grand Tour general classification results timeline

References

External links

1996 births
Living people
French male cyclists
People from Vitry-sur-Seine
Sportspeople from Val-de-Marne
Cyclists from Île-de-France
21st-century French people